Chicky is a nickname. Notable people associated with this name include the following:

Nickname
Chicky Arad, nickname of Roy Arad (born 1977), Israeli poet, singer, script-writer, artist and political activist
Chicky Starr, is the stagename of José Anibal Laureano Colón (born 1958), Puerto Rican professional wrestler and manager

Fictional characters
Chicky, the lead female character in the 2020 Canadian Screen Award nominated film adaptation Bone Cage

See also

Chick (nickname)
Chick (surname)
Chicka (disambiguation)
Chickie (nickname)
Chucky (name)
Chiky Ardil
Chykie Brown